Conference management relates to the executive management of a conference which may be in-house within an organisation, or for a client of a professional conference organiser (PCO). It consists of the basic management tools that involve planning, organising, leading and control. Arranging a conference from conceptualisation to execution can take from 17 days (professionals in the field of conference production) to almost 12 or 18 months. Conferences range from small-scale executive meetings to international summit conferences, and may cater for up to 65,000 people at a time in a venue of appropriate size (e.g. a stadium). Conferences allow attendees from industry, government, scientific disciplines, etc. to meet and network and to inform about recent developments. Conference management relates to the tourism industry and can generate revenue and prestige for a community, town, country or region.

Time management